Eriospermum cooperi is a species of flowering plant of the Asparagaceae family. It is a summer rainfall species found in rocky grassland and open scrub from the Eastern Cape, South Africa to Zimbabwe. It has a solitary erect leaf, white to pale green flowers and grows to 60 cm. The outer tepals are sometimes reddish brown.

References 

cooperi
Taxa named by John Gilbert Baker